Rhathymoscelis is a genus of beetles in the family Cerambycidae, containing the following species:

 Rhathymoscelis batesi Lane, 1965
 Rhathymoscelis  Gounelle, 1910
 Rhathymoscelis haldemanii Thomson, 1860
 Rhathymoscelis melzeri Costa Lima, 1922
 Rhathymoscelis peruibensis Lane, 1951
 Rhathymoscelis rothschildi Lane, 1965
 Rhathymoscelis taunayi Lane, 1936
 Rhathymoscelis wheeleri Lane, 1974
 Rhathymoscelis zikani Melzer, 1931

References

Necydalinae